The 1975 Camel GT Challenge season was the 5th season of the IMSA GT Championship auto racing series.  The series was for GTO and GTU class Grand tourer racing cars.  It began February 1, 1975, and ended November 30, 1975, after seventeen rounds.

Schedule
Some events were run twice, with each running counting as one round.

Season results

External links
 World Sports Racing Prototypes - 1975 IMSA GT Championship results

IMSA GT Championship seasons
IMSA GT